Prana Mithrulu is a 1967 Indian Telugu-language drama film, produced by V. Venkateswarlu under the Padmasri Pictures banner and directed by P. Pullaiah. It stars Akkineni Nageswara Rao, Savitri and Jaggayya, with music composed by K. V. Mahadevan. The film's factory label subplot was inspired by Becket (1964).

Plot
The film begins with Zamindar Chinna Babu Gopala Krishna a proprietor of a shipping company who always enjoys life in the frolic. Chinnaiah / Chinna an orphan, and a true blue, is raised along with Babu. They share a bond beyond a casual friendship, one of the brothers and it is acknowledged by Babu's mother Jagadamba who treats both of them equally. Once Chinna and Babu tease Parvati, a school teacher when she slaps Chinna thereafter they fall in love. Diwanji looks after business affairs, is malice, and wants to grab the property. In many ways, he tries to cheat and manipulate Babu but at every step, Chinna stands as a barrier between them and protects his sovereign. Diwanji gets fed up with Chinna's behavior and humiliates him, as a servant. Angered Babu, entrusts his entire authority. Diwanji could not tolerate it, he uses innocence and pretends to resign from the job. Here Jagadamba feels that it's good for everyone to separate Chinna & Babu. She offers a huge amount to Chinna and asks him to go away from Babu, so that, Babu could take up his responsibilities. But Chinna throws it away and replies, he cannot live without Babu. Then Jagadamba pleads with him, so, he gives her a word to do it. Knowing that Chinna is leaving Babu prays for him to not do so but Chinna does not stand, therefore, Babu keeps the oath on him not to move which makes Chinna a statue. At that moment, Jagadamba's diplomacy fails to bring them together.

Meanwhile, Babu humors and teases Chinna about Parvati, and in a bid to force him to accept love for Parvati, asks him to bring her to him for pleasure. He obliges and asks Parvati the same. Heartbroken, she confronts and gives herself to Babu who sends her safely conscious of the situation. Plus, furious Parvati refuses to ever go back to Chinna. In a bid to clean his image and push Chinna to his senses, Babu marries Padmavati. Herein, via Chinna, she comprehends the complex character of Babu and they form a good marital bond. Meanwhile, Parvati continues to wither away. Labor problems persist in the factory with no one having a clue about how to handle them. So, Chinna is sent as a trojan horse into the labor camp by Babu to prey upon the belief and vulnerabilities of the workforce. At that point, Chinna forges and establishes himself as a labor leader whose true intention is to serve his master. Parvati discerns the drama and desperately tries to educate the labor masses against the plot to no avail. The blind belief of the laborers and their plights changes Chinna's heart. He confronts Babu and stands up as their leader in a true light. Parvati continues to not believe him and accuses him of will.

Subsequently, Babu is unable to bear the rupture between him & Chinna and retrieve him but in vain. Therein, Babu's ego flares and it leads to violent behavior from him. In one instance, he assaults a laborer Simhalu. However, Chinna rescues him from the mob. Then, he tries to prove himself by asking Babu to apologize, but he refuses. In uncontrollable fury, Babu half-sanctions Chinna's murder. Diwan contrives to take these loose words into action. Knowing full well from Padma's help that his life is under threat, Chinna continues on a peaceful march for self-respect to Babu's house. This earns him back Parvati's respect. Ignoring her pleas of life being more important, he marches on. The mob is controlled at the house by Chinna. Despite carrying his gun Babu fails to shoot Chinna, but a counterplan by the Diwan backfires as Appalu, who is the Diwan's henchman, times wrong and fires at Chinna who meets a heroic death. Babu realizes his mistakes but it is too late. Sensing ominous signs, Parvathi too falls at the feet of the local deity and dies. The culprits are all arrested by the police. A statue of Chinna rises in front of the Zamindar Babu's building with all the laborers, paying tearful tribute to Chinna.

Cast
Akkineni Nageswara Rao as Chinnaiah
Savitri as Parvathi
Jaggayya as Chinna Babu Gopala Krishna  
Gummadi as Diwanji 
Relangi as Simhalu
Allu Ramalingaiah as Seshayya
Chadalavada as Appalu
Dr. Sivaramakrishnaiah as Nandesam Seth
A. V. Subba Rao as Raja Visweswara Rao
Raavi Kondala Rao as Pichaiah 
Jagga Rao as Kondaiah 
Santha Kumari as Jagadamba
Kanchana as Padmavathi
Girija as Lachamma
Geetanjali as Kalavar Rani
Sukanya as item number

Soundtrack
Music composed by K. V. Mahadevan.

References

External links 

 

Indian drama films
Films scored by K. V. Mahadevan
Films directed by P. Pullayya